Single's History is the second greatest hits album by Kiyotaka Sugiyama & Omega Tribe. The album peaked at #3 on the Oricon charts.

Background 
The album contains 10 singles from the six single AB sides that have been released up to the release, excluding the 1st B side "Nagisa no Sea-dog" and the 2nd B side "AD 1959". All are single versions, and 7 of the 10 songs will be recorded for the first time on the album. In addition to the lyric card, the record also included a sticker and a reservation application for GB Special, "First Finale."

In 1993, "Nagisa no Sea-dog" and "AD 1959" were included in the  "Single Collection 1983-1985" with the addition of the AB side of the last single "Glass No Palm Tree," but in June 1994, the following recurrence as Q board. It is available as a MEG-CD from September 2016 .

Track listing 
All lyrics are written by Chinfa Kan, except where indicated; music is composed and arranged by Tetsuji Hayashi, except where indicated.

Personnel 
Executive Producers: Katsuhiko Endo, Atsushi Kitamura 
Directors: Shigeru Matsuhashi, Ken Shiguma 
Supervisor: Tetsuji Hayashi 
Recording / Mixing Engineer: Kunihiko "JR." Shimizu 
Cover Design: Takeharu Tanaka, Rikako Furuya

Charts

References 

1985 compilation albums
Omega Tribe (Japanese band) albums